The Tax Parity for Health Plan Beneficiaries Act ( and ) is a bill in the 112th Congress that would equalize tax treatment for employer-provided health coverage for domestic partners and other non-spouse, non-dependent beneficiaries."

Previous versions of the bill 
Previous versions of the bill were introduced in the 108th, 109th, 110th, and 111th Congresses.  In each case, the bill never made it out of committee.

The Senate sponsor was Gordon Smith (R-OR), with 10 cosponsors; in the House, the sponsor was Jim McDermott (D-WA).

The 111th Congress version, the Tax Equity for Domestic Partner and Health Plan Beneficiaries Act, was supported by over 75 major U.S. employers that had joined the Business Coalition for Benefits Tax Equity. The bill was incorporated into the Affordable Health Care for America Act.  However, it was removed from the Patient Protection and Affordable Care Act and the Health Care and Education Reconciliation Act of 2010, the health care reform acts that were passed by the House and Senate then signed into law by President Obama.

Legislative history

References

External links 
 Full text of Senate bill (111th Congress)
 Full text of House bill (111th Congress)
 Human Rights Campaign's fact sheet on the bill

United States proposed federal health legislation
United States proposed federal taxation legislation
LGBT rights in the United States
2009 in LGBT history
2011 in LGBT history
Proposed legislation of the 108th United States Congress
Proposed legislation of the 109th United States Congress
Proposed legislation of the 110th United States Congress
Proposed legislation of the 111th United States Congress
Proposed legislation of the 112th United States Congress
Proposed legislation of the 113th United States Congress